MacPherson Stadium was an indoor stadium that played an important role to the development of youth recreation in Hong Kong. Located at Yim Po Fong Street, on the edge of Mong Kok, a high population density area, it had a capacity of 1,850.

The stadium was within Queen Elizabeth II Youth Centre. It was adjacent to the Macpherson Playground which has a football pitch and acts as a gathering place for youth. The stadium was managed by the Hong Kong Playground Association.

It hosted the official 1983 Asian Basketball Championship.

Name
On 4May 1929, the Hong Kong Government founded the Playing Fields Committee to provide social welfare services to local children, J. L. McPherson being among the founding members. On 4 May 1933, when the Children's Playgrounds Association became a reality, McPherson was named Honorary Secretary. John Livingstone McPherson (1874-1947) had been a missionary assigned to Hong Kong from Canada, working for the YMCA of Hong Kong from 1905 to 1935. At his retirement, appreciation was shown for the work he had done in Hong Kong, among which was the founding of the Children's Playground. Macpherson left for Canada in 1935, but lived out the remainder of his life in Tunbridge Wells, Kent, England and died there in 1947.

History

The stadium was opened by the Governor Sir Alexander Grantham on 7 September 1953, while the foundation stone was laid by the Duchess of Kent. It held its last basketball tournament in October 2008 and was demolished for a residential complex and a new indoor stadium.

Redevelopment

The site was redeveloped into MacPherson Place, a complex comprising the new MacPherson Stadium, a youth centre, and two residential towers (1A and 1B), collectively named MacPherson Residence. Developed by Kowloon Development and the Hong Kong Playground Association, it comprises 293 apartments. The address of MacPherson Place is 38 Nelson Street. The foundation stone of its predecessor, Queen Elizabeth II Youth Centre, has been preserved within.

References

External links

 Website of the new Macpherson Stadium
 Website of MacPherson Residence

Former buildings and structures in Hong Kong
Mong Kok
Sports venues in Hong Kong
Taekwondo venues
Music venues in Hong Kong